The Khanzada are a sub-group within the Khanzada community found in eastern Uttar Pradesh in India. They also refer to themselves as Gautam Thakurs. The Gautam Khanzada are Muslim converts from the Gautam community.

Origin
At various times in history, different lineages of the rajputs Khanzada converted to Islam. The rajputs Khanzada of Fatehpur District are said to have converted during the rule of the Mughal Emperor Jehangir. This group of rajputss claim descent from Ratan Sen, who is said to be married to the daughter of Jaichand of Kannauj. Through him descended two brothers, Bijai Singh and Bahrawat Singh. Bijai Singh took the name Bijli Khan, and his descendants are now found mainly in Bhainsauli. They were at one time substantial landowners. Bahrawat Singh, on his conversion to Islam took the name Bahadur Khan, was granted eighty four villages, that former the estate of Tappa Jar. His son Mansoor founded the village of Mansoorpur while another son Sarmast founded the village of Sarmastpur. These two villages plus the village of Garhi Jar and Bahadur pur  Meona were home to families who played an important role in the history of Fatehpur District.

Another prominent rajputs family was that of the Rajahs of Azamgarh. The family claimed descent from Chandra Sen, who had two sons, Sagar Singh and Abhiman Singh. Sagar Singh converted to Islam, and took the name Daulat Khan. He passed his estate on to his nephew Harbans Singh. It was Harbans Singh son Bikramjit Singh, also known as Azam Khan who founded the city of Azamgarh. His brother Azmat founded the town of Azmatgarh. The Rajahs of Azamgarh maintained their independence until their principality fell to the British in the late 18th Century. Another rajputs family in Azamgarh District was that of the Sidhari Babus, who were also substantial landowners. Other minor rajputs Khanzada landowners included the chaudhary of Khutahan Shahgang in Jaunpur District, as well as minor landowners in Sitapur District.

Present circumstances
The sense of Rajput identity amongst the rajputs Khanzada remains strong, especially those of Fatehpur District. In their marriages too, Rajput customs are followed, like bursting of fire crackers and sending specially made laddoos to community members, which form part of marriage celebrations. The community also practices clan exogamy, marrying into other Khanzada communities such as the Dikhit Khanzada. Rajput traditions have eclipsed the religious divide and forged a common identity for the Hindu rajputs Thakurs and the rajputs Muslims. This is seen by the act that Hindu rajputs Thakurs participate in Muslim rajputs functions, while rajputs Muslims participate in intercommunity functions including religious ones. For example, rajputs Muslims help organise Holi milans, Ram Lilas and kirtans.

References

Khanzada
Rajput clans
Social groups of Uttar Pradesh
Muslim communities of Uttar Pradesh